David Walker may refer to:

Businessmen 
 David Walker (banker) (born 1939), British banker, ex-chairman of Morgan Stanley International
 David Walker, English/American brewer, co-founder of Firestone Walker Brewing Company in 1996
 David Davis Walker (1840–1918), American businessman

Clergy
 David Walker (Catholic bishop), Australian Roman Catholic bishop since 1996
 David Walker (bishop of Manchester) (born 1957), Church of England bishop

Musicians
 David Walker, American opera singer, winner of the 1998 Metropolitan Opera National Council Auditions
 David Walker, former singer with the American Gospel quartet the Kingdom Heirs
 David G. Walker (born 1946), British pianist, singer and composer 
 David T. Walker (born 1941), American guitarist
 Dave Walker (born 1945), British musician, member of the band Fleetwood Mac
 Bunker Hill (musician) (1941–1986), stage name of American R&B and gospel singer born David Walker

Politicians
 David Walker (Canadian politician) (born 1947), Canadian politician who served in the Canadian House of Commons 
 David Walker (Kentucky politician) (died 1820), United States Representative from Kentucky
 David Walker (West Virginia politician) (born 1952), member of the West Virginia House of Delegates
 David James Walker (1905–1995), Canadian politician
 David S. Walker (1815–1891), governor of Florida

Civil servants
 David M. Walker (U.S. Comptroller General) (born 1951), 7th Comptroller General of the United States
 David Marr Walker (1835–1920), Canadian lawyer, judge and political figure in Manitoba
 David Walker (diplomat), WTO trade representative from New Zealand

Academics 
 David Walker (historian) (born 1945), Australian historian of the Australian - Asian engagement
 David A. Walker (scientist) (1928–2012), British professor of photosynthesis
 David Maxwell Walker (1920–2014), Scottish lawyer and academic
 David Grant Walker (1923–2017), British historian

Sportsmen
 David Walker (American football coach) (born 1969), former college football star and assistant coach for the Indianapolis Colts
 David Walker (basketball) (born 1993), American basketball player
 David Walker (cricketer) (1913–1942), English cricketer
 David Walker (quarterback) (born 1955), former American football quarterback for Texas A&M University
 David Walker (racing driver) (born 1941), Australian racing driver
 David Walker (rower) (born 1932), British Olympic rower
 David Walker (boxer), English boxer
 Dave Walker (footballer, born 1908), English footballer for Walsall and Brighton & Hove Albion
 Dave Walker (footballer, born 1941) (1941–2015), English footballer for Burnley and Southampton
 Dave Walker, Scottish former professional footballer, played for St. Mirren FC in the 1959 Scottish Cup Final

Others
 Dave Walker (1955–2014), Canadian writer who died under mysterious circumstances; see Death of Dave Walker
 David Walker (abolitionist) (1796–1830), American black abolitionist
 David Walker (author) (1911–1992), Scottish-born Canadian writer
 David Walker (journalist) (born 1941), American television news anchor
 Sir David Walker (RAF administrative officer) (born 1956), Royal Air Force air marshal and Master of the Household to the Queen
 David Walker (RAF aircrew officer) (fl. 1978–2016), Royal Air Force air marshal
 David M. Walker (astronaut) (1944–2001), United States astronaut
 David Walker (EastEnders), fictional character on the BBC soap opera, EastEnders
 David Walker (born 1976), birth name of Angus Oblong, American author and illustrator